Muhammad Sajjad Khan was a Pakistani militant and Commander-in-Chief of Harkat ul-Ansar. He was known as Sajjad Afghani, due to his participation in the Soviet-Afghan War.

Early life
He was born in the village of Baibakh, Rawalakot, in the Poonch District of Pakistani Kashmir.

Soviet Afghan War
Sajjad Afghani joined the militancy under the banner of Harkat-ul-Mujahideen in the 1980s. He was well trained and remained involved in the Soviet-Afghan war. He stayed in Afghanistan until 1989.

Commander in Chief
In 1991 he became Commander in Chief of Harkat Ul Ansar in Srinagar. In June 1994 he was arrested along with Molana Masood Azhar by the Indian military. He was detained by 15 Corps headquarters at Jammu. Lt. Gen. Arjun Ray, then Brigadier General Staff (BGS), described Afghani, a frail but visibly tough militant who had fought the Russians, as the "biggest catch" given his importance in militant circles.

Death
According to Indian sources, Sajjad Afghani was killed during an unsuccessful jailbreak from the high security Kot Bhalwal Jail in 1999. He is buried in Jammu Graveyard. His death led to the hijacking, by Harkat, of Indian Airlines Flight 814 in December, which led to the release of Maulana Masood Azhar, Ahmed Omar Saeed Sheikh (both Harkat members) and Mushtaq Ahmed Zargar by the Indian Government. His body was also one of the initial demands of the hijackers.

References

Year of birth missing
1999 deaths
Kashmiri militants
People from Rawalakot
Mujahideen members of the Soviet–Afghan War
Pakistani Islamists
Members of jihadist groups
Leaders of Islamic terror groups
Islamist insurgents
People of the Kashmir conflict
Deobandis
Burials in India